Roses from the South is a 1954 West German comedy film directed by Franz Antel and starring Maria Holst, Gustav Fröhlich, and Karl Schönböck. It was shot at the Wiesbaden Studios in Hesse and on location in Cannes and Nice on the French Riviera.

Main cast

References

Bibliography

External links 
 

1954 films
1954 comedy films
German comedy films
West German films
1950s German-language films
Films directed by Franz Antel
German black-and-white films
1950s German films
Films shot in Nice